Braćo i sestre is the first live album by the Serbian rock band Električni Orgazam, released in 1987.

Track listing 
All tracks by Srđan Gojković Gile, except where noted.
 "Svaka nova noć" (3:30)
 "Klinci traže zabavu" (2:10)
 "Debela devojka" (2:32)
 "Nebo" (Ljubomir Jovanović, Đorđe Otašević) (2:07)
 "I'm Waiting For My Man" (Lou Reed) (2:55)
 "Krokodili dolaze" (6:05)
 "Bejbe, ti nisi tu (Mick Jagger, Keith Richards(3:35)
 "Pođimo" (2:15)
 "Kako bubanj kaže" (4:04)
 "Locomotion" (Carole King, Gerry Goffin (3:03)
 "Ne postojim" (2:20)
 "Ja sam težak kao konj" (2:30)
 "Konobar" (Ljubomir Đukić) (2:15)

Personnel 
 Srđan Gojković Gile (guitar, vocals)
 Branislav Petrović Banana (guitar)
 Zoran Radomirović Švaba (bass)
 Goran Čavajda Čavke (drums)

Additional personnel 
 Dražen Vrdoljak (band introduction)
 Ljubomir Đukić (lead vocals on track 10)

References 
 Official website discography page
 Braćo i sestre at Discogs

1987 live albums
Jugoton live albums
Električni Orgazam live albums